Horace Pike (17 December 1869 – 1936) was an English footballer who played in the Football League for Loughborough and Nottingham Forest.

Pike made his debut for Forest in the FA Cup second round replay against Chatham Town on 23 February 1889 which ended in a 2-2 draw. In the second replay 5 days later, Pike scored his first Forest goal.

He scored Forest's first ever goal in the Football League on 3 September 1892 in the 2–2 draw against Everton. That goal was also the first ever goal in a league game at Goodison Park. 

Horace Pike was a member of the Pike family from Keyworth which produced cricketers and footballers. These included Harry Pike and Arthur Pike. On 4 January 1890, Horace, Arthur and Harry all played in the same Nottingham Forest side in a home match against Sheffield Wednesday. Forest lost 3-1.

Towards the end of his football career, Horace emigrated to the USA.

References

1869 births
1936 deaths
English footballers
Association football forwards
English Football League players
Nottingham Forest F.C. players
Loughborough F.C. players
People from Keyworth
Footballers from Nottinghamshire